Valenzuela elegans is a species of psocoptera in the family Caeciliusidae, the lizard barklice. It is found in Haiti and the Hispaniola island.

References 

 Mockford, E.L. 1999: A classification of the psocopteran family Caeciliusidae (Caeciliidae auct.) Transactions of the American Entomological Society, 125(4): 325-417.

External links 

 
 Valenzuela elegans at insectoid.info

Caeciliusidae
Insects described in 1969
Fauna of Haiti